The 1982 Peach Bowl, part of the 1982–83 bowl season, took place on December 31, 1982, at Atlanta–Fulton County Stadium in Atlanta, Georgia. The competing teams were the Iowa Hawkeyes, representing the Big Ten Conference, and the Tennessee Volunteers of the Southeastern Conference (SEC). This was the first ever meeting between the schools, and Iowa was victorious by a final score of 28–22.

Teams

Iowa

Tennessee

Game summary

Team statistics

Individual leaders
Passing
Iowa: Long – 19–26, 304 yds, 3 TD, 1 INT
Tenn: Cockrell – 22–41, 221 yds, 1 TD

Rushing
Iowa: Gill – 16 carries, 70 yds; Phillips – 10 carries, 34 yds, 1 TD
Tenn: Coleman – 11 carries, 103 yds, 1 TD; Furnas – 12 carries, 52 yds

Receiving
Iowa: Moritz – 8 catches, 168 yds, 1 TD; Harmon – 3 catches, 44 yds, 2 TD
Tenn: Wilson – 7 catches, 62 yds; Duncan – 3 catches, 52 yds

References

Peach Bowl
Peach Bowl
Iowa Hawkeyes football bowl games
Tennessee Volunteers football bowl games
December 1982 sports events in the United States
Peach Bowl